The Nelson Giants are a New Zealand basketball team based in Nelson. The Giants compete in the National Basketball League (NBL) and play their home games at the Trafalgar Centre. For sponsorship reasons, they are known as the NBS Nelson Giants. The Giants are the only remaining original team from the league's inaugural season, as all other teams have spent at least one year out of the league, for various reasons.

Team history
The Nelson Giants were a foundation member of the National Basketball League (NBL) in 1982. The Giants made their first NBL final in 1990, where they lost to the Canterbury Rams in what was the NBL's first all-South Island final. In 1994, the Giants won their maiden championship with a 67–66 win over the Rams in the final. In 1996 and 1997, the Giants lost back-to-back championship series, before winning their second NBL championship in 1998 with an 81–73 win over the North Harbour Kings in the final. In 2000, 2002, and 2004, the Giants were runners-up. In 2007, the Giants won their third championship with a 2–0 series win over the Hawke's Bay Hawks. In 2009 and 2013, the Giants were runners-up.

The Trafalgar Centre was Nelson's home stadium from 1982 until being closed because of its earthquake risk in December 2013. As a result, the Giants played out of Saxton Stadium in 2014 and 2015. The team returned to the Trafalgar Centre in 2016 after the venue completed earthquake strengthening.

Current roster

References

External links
 Official team website
 
 "Nelson Giants throw back to 1997 for final game of National Basketball League season" at stuff.co.nz

National Basketball League (New Zealand) teams
Basketball teams in New Zealand
Basketball teams established in 1982
1982 establishments in New Zealand